Yaacov (Yana) Liberman (born March 10, 1923) is a Chinese-Israeli Zionist politician and author. In 1948 he emigrated to Israel.

Liberman was born in Harbin, China into a wealthy Russian Jewish family, to Semyon Liberman from Sevastopol and Gisia Zuboreva from Nikolayevsk-on-Amur. He was a Zionist leader in Shanghai and wrote two books: My China: Jewish Life in the Orient: 1900–1950 and Tears of Zion: Divided We Stand.

References

1923 births
Living people
Chinese Jews
Chinese people of Russian-Jewish descent
Chinese Zionists
Chinese emigrants to Israel
Writers from Harbin